Gonocephalus lacunosus, Manthey's forest dragon, is a species of agamid lizard. It is found in Indonesia.

References

Gonocephalus
Reptiles of Indonesia
Reptiles described in 1991
Taxa named by Ulrich Manthey
Taxa named by Wolfgang Denzer
Fauna of Sumatra